Urquidez is a surname. Notable people with the surname include:

Benny Urquidez (born 1952), American kickboxer, martial arts choreographer, and actor
Jason Urquidez (born 1982), Mexican-American baseball pitcher

Basque-language surnames